The class MY is a class of diesel-electric locomotives built in the years 1954–65 by NOHAB. A total of 59 units, numbered 1101–1159, were delivered to the Danish State Railways. Powered by GM-EMD engines, the locomotives represented a significant change in rolling stock policy — motive power had largely been sourced from within Denmark for several decades.

History
In the early 50s the DSB was starting to look for a new type of motive power that could replace steam locomotives in Denmark.

MY 1101 was built by NOHAB alone, but all subsequent units had bodies, underbodies and bogies built at Danish manufacturer Frichs in order to limit foreign currency spending. For the same reason, and because of pressure from Danish industry, the electrical systems of MY 1105 and later were sub-supplied by Danish companies Thrige and Titan.

The DSB ordered the first four units which arrived at Helsingør in 1954. The locomotives quickly became very popular among both passengers and crew.

44 of them were built between 1954 and 1958 and a further batch of 15 engines was delivered in 1964 and 1965. 

To replace steam on branch lines, a similar but lighter locomotive, the class MX, was developed, incorporating a 12-cylinder 567 engine.

In their early years the locomotives hauled express trains (later known as InterCity) and heavy freight services, but in their later years they were transferred to smaller regional and light freight services.

In the 1980s and 90s the DSB began to have less and less need for them, and the last ordinary MY-hauled train ran in 2001. One unit however, 1135, was a special service locomotive which runs special trains, so DSB still had MY locos in service until 2010, it was then handed over to the Danish Railway Museum in Odense, who uses it for heritage trains along with unit 1101. The others have either been scrapped or sold to diverse private operators in Norway, Germany and Sweden, who now use them on light freight duties. They are called TMY in Sweden (as diesel locomotives have names beginning with T in Sweden).

Many locomotives similar to the MY survive in other countries. They include:

 Norwegian State Railways Class Di 3
 Hungarian State Railways Class M61
 Chemins de fer luxembourgeois Class 1600
 National Railway Company of Belgium Class 52–54

Technical details
The first four units, 1101–1104, were delivered with 1,700-hp EMD 567B engines along with a spare engine. Having a spare engine was later deemed unnecessary and the fifth 567B engine was thus built into MY 1105. 1106–1144 were delivered with 1,950-hp EMD 567C engines. MY 1145–1159 were delivered with 1,950-hp EMD 567D1 engines. However, their powerplants were frequently swapped around among the locomotives during maintenance. 

MY 1149 received a spare 645E engine (as used in class MZ, though with the turbocharger removed) after sustaining severe frost damage in the harsh winter of 1978–79.

DSB Class MV
Starting in 1968 weaker MYs with 567B engines (1101, 1102, 1104, 1109, 1134) were reclassified as class MV keeping the same numbers. In 1973, MV 1104 became a MY again while MY 1144 became a MV when their powerplants were swapped. Further two MV locomotives (1101, 1134) were subsequently reclassified as class MY in 1981 and 1984 and the remainder three were taken out of service between 1985 and 1987.

Livery
The locomotives were delivered in DSB's then-standard maroon colour, with horizontal white stripes along the mid and bottom of the sides and a yellow winged wheel at each front. Starting in 1965, the DIN 1451 typeface was slowly introduced for the lettering, and a few locomotives were given an "economy" maroon livery without stripes during the 1970s.

A new design with black sides and red cabs was introduced by DSB in 1972. The first class MY unit to receive the new livery was MY 1147 in 1972, with the remaining locomotives repainted between 1975 and 1985.

Preservation
Several members of the MY class have so far been preserved. 
By the Danish Railway Museum no. 
1101 has been repainted into the original maroon livery without numbers on the front, she will only be used on special occasions to reduce wear and tear
1112 in the design livery with red cabs and black body, with one side removed to show the inside of the locomotive
1135 has been repainted into the maroon livery in 2017, from the so called IC (Red/Black/Red) design livery.

1159 was sold off from the Railway Museum to a Danish private entrepreneur.

See also
 Bulldog nose
 DSB Class MX

References

Notes

Bibliography

External links

 jernbanen.dk
 GM-nyt.dk
 Roundnoses.com
 Nohab-GM.de (German)

MY
NOHAB locomotives
A1A-A1A locomotives
Railway locomotives introduced in 1954
Diesel-electric locomotives of Denmark
Standard gauge locomotives of Denmark